The Kopaynski or Kopanski (Polish: Kopański) family is a descendant of a Silesian noble family, first mentioned in Roman Catholic scripts in 931 through Count (Graf) Carl Friedrich Kopański. 1250 Members of the Polish Szlachta. 1772 Raised into the Prussian aristocracy by King Frederick the Great (Friedrich II, r. 1740-86). 
Silesia
The Expulsion of Germans after World War II led to House of Kopanski to flee into exile to Germany (Baden-Wuerttemberg). The last two living descendants are Veronika Therese Countess von Kopanski and Marianne von Kopanski. Since 1956 the family resides near Stuttgart.

Last split into the family lines:

    * Schneider-Kopanski
    * Kopanski (Stuttgart line)

References

Silesian nobility
Polish noble families